Epiblema albohamulana is a moth belonging to the family Tortricidae. The species was first described by Hans Rebel in 1893.

It is native to Europe.

References

Eucosmini
Moths described in 1893